Miguel Changa Chaiwa (born 7 April 2004) is a Zambian professional footballer who plays as a defensive midfielder for Swiss Super League club Young Boys and the Zambia national team.

Career
A youth product of Shamuel Academy, Chaiwa joined the Zambian club Atletico Lusaka on loan in 2022. He transferred to the Swiss club Young Boys on 14 June 2022, signing a 4-year contract.

International career
Chaiwa is a youth international for Zambia, having represented the Zambia U17s in 2019 and 2020. He debuted for the senior Zambia national team in a friendly 3–1 loss to Iraq on 20 March 2022.

Personal life
Chaiwa's father, Changa was also a professional footballer in Zambia.

References

External links
 
 

2004 births
Living people
People from Luanshya
Zambian footballers
Zambia international footballers
Zambia youth international footballers
Association football midfielders
BSC Young Boys players
Swiss Super League players
Zambian expatriate footballers
Zambian expatriate sportspeople in Switzerland
Expatriate footballers in Switzerland